Brenda Cooper (born August 12, 1960) is an author and futurist who resides in Kirkland, Washington, where she is the Chief Information Officer of the city of Kirkland.
She has co-written various short stories with Larry Niven and has written ten novels.

Brenda was educated at California State University, Fullerton, where she earned a BA in Management Information Systems. She is also pursuing an MFA at StoneCoast, a program of the University of Southern Maine.

Brenda lives in Woodinville, Washington with her family and three dogs.

Bibliography

Novels
 Building Harlequin's Moon, (2005) written with Larry Niven.
 
 
Silver Ship series
 
 
 
Ruby's Song
 
The Diamond Deep (2013)
The Glittering Edge  (sequels to Ruby's Song)

Short fiction

Stories

Poetry

Critical studies and reviews of Cooper's work
Edge of dark

Awards
Endeavor Award
 The Silver Ship and the Sea (Distinguished Novel or Collection, 2008)
 Edge of Dark (Distinguished Novel or Collection, 2016)

References

External links
 Authors Website

American women writers
Living people
Writers from Kirkland, Washington
1960 births
21st-century American women